Laura M. de Seroux (born February 9, 1952 in Los Angeles, California) is a retired trainer of Thoroughbred racehorses. In 2002 she became the second female to win a Breeders' Cup race and the only female to train an American Horse of the Year.

Early career
Born Laura M. Lubisich, in 1986 she married Emmanuel de Seroux, a bloodstock agent she met while on business in France. She learned race conditioning of Thoroughbreds from Hall of Fame trainer Charlie Whittingham for whom she exercised horses for sixteen  years. She then began managing parts of the racing operations for owners Nelson Bunker Hunt and Bruce McNall in both North America and Europe. On Laura de Seroux's advice, in September 1987 McNall purchased a half interest in Trempolino. Five days later Trempolino won the Prix de l'Arc de Triomphe, smashing the race record time for Europe's most prestigious race by 1.4 seconds. Laura de Seroux also was instrumental in McNall's purchase of Saumarez who gave him his second "Arc" win in 1990.

Training career
Laura de Seroux took out a trainer's license in 1999 using San Luis Rey Downs in Bonsall, California as a base. Her big break came in August 2001 when she was given eight horses to condition for the estate of Allen Paulson who had been one of racing's most successful owners and astute breeders. Among the eight horses was the very good racemare Astra, who in 2002 would win two Grade 1 races and a Grade 2 under the race conditioning of Laura de Seroux. However, the star of the stable was Azeri who won eight of her nine starts in 2002, capping it off with a 5-length win in the Breeders' Cup Distaff. The de Seroux stable's earnings in 2002 of $3,894,906 broke the record for most earnings by a female trainer set by Jenine Sahadi in 1996.

The Irish three-year-old horse Ballingarry from the Coolmore Stud was purchased by Sidney L. Port in October 2002. He was turned over to Laura de Seroux to handle the colt's training in the United States. Ballingarry won back-to-back editions of the Stars and Stripes Turf Handicap in 2003 and 2004.

In 2004 Laura de Seroux entered her first starter in the prestigious Hollywood Gold Cup and won it when Hall of Fame jockey Mike Smith rode Total Impact, owned by a Saudi royal, Sultan bin Mohammed, to victory.

After a short but brilliant training career Laura de Seroux retired at the end of March, 2007.

References

1952 births
Living people
American female horse trainers
People from Los Angeles
21st-century American women